The Post Cognitive is a television series which aired on NTTV from 2004 to 2006.

Synopsis
The series is a throwback to the science fiction of the 1960s.

Episodes

Season One
 Episode 101 - "Pilot"
 Episode 102 - "Trapped"

Season Two
 Episode 201 - "Renaissance Man"
 Episode 202 - "The Textbook"

Awards
In 2005, the pilot won the Lone Star Emmy award for "Best Student Production". The following year, "Renaissance Man" (written and directed by series creator Jimmy McCoy) and "The Textbook" (written and directed by Matthew Muhl) were both nominated for the same award (of which the former won).

References

2004 American television series debuts
2006 American television series endings